Daniele Sciarra (born 12 July 1991 in Atri) is an Italian footballer who plays as a forward for Chieti on loan from Serie B side Pescara.

References

External links
 
 

1991 births
Living people
Sportspeople from the Province of Teramo
Italian footballers
Association football forwards
A.S.D. Barletta 1922 players
Delfino Pescara 1936 players
S.F. Aversa Normanna players
Footballers from Abruzzo